Pushlakhta is a rural locality (a village) in Pertominskoye Rural Settlement of Primorsky District, Arkhangelsk Oblast, Russia. The population was 54 as of 2010.

Geography 
Pushlakhta is located 284 km west of Arkhangelsk (the district's administrative centre) by road.

References 

Rural localities in Primorsky District, Arkhangelsk Oblast